Telovýchodná jednota Partizán Domaniža, commonly known as TJ Partizán Domaniža is a Slovak football team, based in the village of Domaniža. It plays in V. liga Severozápad HUMMEL ZsFZ The club was founded in 1948.

On 27 August 2022, the first team played a friendly match with the Qatar national football team in Vienna.

References

External links 
TJ Partizán Domaniža  - team and results
TJ Partizán Domaniža  - history of the team

Partizan Domaniza
Association football clubs established in 1948
1948 establishments in Slovakia